The Wienerschnitzel Wiener Nationals is a Dachshund racing event featuring Dachshunds and is held in California. The event is a charity event for Seal Beach Animal Care Center. The event has been held yearly for twenty-two years.

About the event 
Wienerschnitzel Wiener Nationals is a racing event where dachshunds compete for the title of “fastest wiener in the west” and a cash prize. The dachshunds start from a gate and run approximately fifty yards to their owners who are usually enticing them with a ball or treat. The race focuses on the dog's ability to remain within the boundaries of the racing lane while maintaining speed. Regional qualifiers from Texas, California, and other southwestern states come together at Los Alamitos Race Course in California to race in the “Holiday Bowl” and participate annually in the “Holiday Bowl Parade,” a yearly event focused on the Holiday Bowl Football Game. With an average attendance of 15,000 people, the tournament has raised more than $250,000 for its beneficiary, the Seal Beach Animal Care Center which provides shelter and care to the homeless animals of Seal Beach, California. The first Wiener Nationals was held in 1996 and has been a tradition for wiener dog lovers ever since. The 22nd annual running of the Wienerschnitzel Wiener Nationals was held on July 22, 2017.

Only genuine low to ground dachshunds are allowed to compete.

Famous racers 
 “Baby Bo” is the winner of the 22nd annual Wiener Nationals with a time of 7:05. He qualified for finals with a time of 5:80, which is believed to be the fastest in Wiener Nationals History. He gained the lead in the last twenty yards despite a slow start. He is one and a half years old and was the runt of his liter. 
 “Lady Bug” was once a paralyzed little pup, but after recovery she was able to race in Wiener Nationals in 2017. Lady Bug was adopted by Dr. Deanna O’Neil, a veterinarian that treated Lady Bug for the paralysis in her hind legs. At first, Lady Bug was intended to be put down. However, being rescued by the Dachshund Rescue of Los Angeles, she was put through intense physical therapy and a recovery schedule that included running on an underwater treadmill and acupuncture therapy. After a successful recovery, Lady Bug was able to participate in the 22nd annual Wiener Nationals.

Wienners recent history

About the breed 
Dachshunds are a low maintenance, easy to train, common show breed. The miniature dachshund weighs about eleven pounds or less at maturity. Standard dachshunds weigh sixteen to thirty-two pounds. Dachshunds weighing eleven to sixteen pounds are unofficially called “tweenies.” The classic “smooth” dachshunds are the original short-haired dog. Long-haired dachshunds were bred by crossing the smooth dachshunds with spaniels. The “classic” dachshund is red or black-and-tan. The most common long-haired color is gray. Standard long-haired dachshunds are usually bigger and have calmer temperaments. Dachshunds' long, lean, muscular body, and fast stride make them excellent contenders for racing and showing.

Media surrounding the event 
A documentary called “Wiener Takes All,” released in 2007, debuts the surprisingly cutthroat environment of Wiener Nationals. Local news broadcasts the event and there are several articles focusing on the event and participants. The homepage of Wiener Nationals features pictures of the Holiday Bowl Parade and the winning dachshunds with their owners.

Reference list

External links 

 Official website

Dog sports
Sports in San Diego
Recurring sporting events established in 1996
1996 establishments in California